Darren Thomas Knowles (born 8 October 1970) is an English footballer who played in The Football League for Stockport County, Scarborough and Hartlepool United.

References

Profile at FootballDatabase.eu

English footballers
Sheffield United F.C. players
Stockport County F.C. players
Scarborough F.C. players
Hartlepool United F.C. players
Northwich Victoria F.C. players
Gainsborough Trinity F.C. players
Stocksbridge Park Steels F.C. players
Ilkeston Town F.C. (1945) players
English Football League players
1970 births
Living people
Association football defenders